William Heathcote was launched in Liverpool in 1800. She made one voyage as a slave ship in the triangular trade in enslaved people. Next, a French privateer captured her in a single-ship action, and the British Royal Navy recaptured her. She became a West Indiaman before she made an enslaving voyage, one of the last such legal voyages. zAfter British partiipation in the trans-Atlantic slave trade ended, she became a West Indiaman again; she sailed to Brazil and as a transport. She was wrecked in July 1816.

Career
William Heathcote first appeared in Lloyd's Register (LR) in 1800.

1st enslaving voyage (1800–1802): Captain John Stothart acquired a letter of marque on 30 September 1800. He sailed from Liverpool on 18 November. William Heathcote acquired captives in Bonny and arrived in May 1801 in Demerara with 373 captives. Lloyd's List reported on 3 March 1801 that a schooner, bound for St Domingo from Bordeaux, had come into Dominica.

William Heathcote arrived back at Liverpool on 9 April 1802. She had left Liverpool with 60 crew members and she suffered 14 crew deaths on her voyage.

On her return from Demerara William Heathcote became a West Indiaman.

On 4 August 1804 William Heathcote was returning to Liverpool from Demerara when a French privateer captured her. In the action leading up to the capture, Captain Phillips, his son, a passenger, and a seaman were killed, and the mate, a passenger  and seven seamen wounded; General Auguereau had three men killed and her captain and five men wounded. On 9 August  recaptured William Heathcote and sent her into Plymouth. William Heathcote was carrying a cargo that the press reported was worth £80,000 and that consisted of cotton, coffee, indigo, cochineal, sugar, and cotton. The capture took place off Bayonne and  shared by agreement. The hired armed brig  escorted William Heathcote into Liverpool on 2 October 1804. The underwriters agreed a valuation of £36,000 for the cargo and £8,000 pounds for the vessel.

2nd enslaving voyage (1807–1808): Captain Moses Joynson acquired a letter of marque on 17 March 1807. The Slave Trade Act 1807, which forbade British ships to engage in the slave trade, took effect on 1 May 1807, but William Heathcote must have cleared customs outbound before that date as Captain Joyson did not sail until 6 July. William Heathcote arrived in Suriname in February 1808. She arrived back in Liverpool on 17 August.

Captain John Hanley acquired a letter of marque on 11 December 1810.

In February 1816 an advertisement appeared in the press stating that William Heathcote, William Batman, master, was intending to sail to Philadelphia, Pennsylvania. She sailed on 11 February but had to put back two days later leaky and with her main top mast sprung.

Fate
William Heathcote was wrecked in July 1816 on Bier Island. Her crew and part of her materials were saved. She was on a voyage from Philadelphia to Saint John, New Brunswick. British North America.

Notes

Citations

References

See also
 

1800 ships
Age of Sail merchant ships of England
Liverpool slave ships
Captured ships
Maritime incidents in 1816